State Route 291 (SR 291) is a  route that serves as a connection between SR 759 and US 278/US 431 in the eastern section of Gadsden in Etowah County. It was originally proposed as an extension of SR 759.

Route description
The southern terminus of SR 291 is located at the eastern terminus of SR 759. From this point, the route generally travels in a northerly direction before terminating at US 278/US 431 in Gadsden.

Major intersections

References

External links

291
Transportation in Etowah County, Alabama
Gadsden, Alabama
State highways in the United States shorter than one mile